This article provides information on candidates who stood for the 1967 Australian Senate election. The election was held on 25 November 1967.

Retiring Senators

Labor
Senator Archie Benn (Qld)
Senator Nick McKenna (Tas)
Senator Theo Nicholls (SA)

Liberal
Senator Marie Breen (Vic)
Senator Denham Henty (Tas)
Senator Ted Mattner (SA)
Senator Kenneth Morris (Qld)

Country
Senator Sir Walter Cooper (Qld)

Senate
Sitting Senators are shown in bold text. Tickets that elected at least one Senator are highlighted in the relevant colour. Successful candidates are identified by an asterisk (*).

New South Wales
Five seats were up for election. The Labor Party was defending three seats. The Liberal-Country Coalition was defending two seats. Senators Ken Anderson (Liberal), Tom Bull (Country), Sir Alister McMullin (Liberal), Tony Mulvihill (Labor) and James Ormonde (Labor) were not up for re-election.

Queensland
Five seats were up for election. The Labor Party was defending one seat. The Liberal-Country Coalition was defending four seats. Senators Felix Dittmer (Labor), Vince Gair (Democratic Labor), Jim Keeffe (Labor), Ellis Lawrie (Country) and Ian Wood (Liberal) were not up for re-election.

South Australia

Five seats were up for election. The Labor Party was defending three seats. The Liberal Party was defending two seats. Senators Gordon Davidson (Liberal), Arnold Drury (Labor), Keith Laught (Liberal), Clem Ridley (Labor) and Jim Toohey (Labor) were not up for re-election.

Tasmania

Five seats were up for election. The Labor Party was defending two seats. The Liberal Party was defending two seats. Independent Senator Reg Turnbull was defending one seat. Senators Don Devitt (Labor), Bert Lacey (Labor), Elliot Lillico (Liberal), John Marriott (Liberal) and Justin O'Byrne (Labor) were not up for re-election.

Victoria

Five seats were up for election. The Labor Party was defending two seats. The Liberal-Country Coalition was defending three seats. Senators John Gorton (Liberal), Bert Hendrickson (Labor), Pat Kennelly (Labor), Frank McManus (Democratic Labor) and Dame Ivy Wedgwood (Liberal) were not up for re-election.

Western Australia
Five seats were up for election. The Labor Party was defending three seats. The Liberal Party was defending one seat. The Country Party was defending one seat. Senators George Branson (Liberal), Harry Cant (Labor), Tom Drake-Brockman (Country), Malcolm Scott (Liberal) and John Wheeldon (Labor) were not up for re-election.

Summary by party 

Beside each party is an indication of whether the party contested the Senate election in each state.

See also
 1967 Australian Senate election
 Members of the Australian Senate, 1965–1968
 Members of the Australian Senate, 1968–1971
 List of political parties in Australia

References
Adam Carr's Election Archive - Senate 1967

Australian Senate election 1967 Candidates
Candidates for Australian federal elections